The 2011 Torneo Clausura or LXXXIX Campeonato Nacional de Fútbol Profesional de la Primera División de Chile was the 89th season of the Chilean Primera División. The champions was Universidad de Chile which won its 15th league title after beating Cobreloa in the finals.

The season started on 29 July, and concluded on 29 December.

Teams

Stadia and locations

Managerial changes

League table

Results

Aggregate table

Playoffs

Results

Quarterfinals

Semifinals

Finals

Relegation / Promotion Playoffs

Top goalscorers

References

External links
ANFP 
2011 Torneo Clausura at Soccerway
Season regulations 

Primera División de Chile seasons
Chile
Prim